Josh Bowden (born 14 January 1992) is an English rugby league footballer who plays as a  or  for Wakefield Trinity in the Betfred Super League.

He has previously played for Hull F.C. in the Super League, and spent time on loan Hull at the York City Knights and Doncaster in the Kingstone Press Championship.

Background
Bowden was born in Beverley, East Riding of Yorkshire, England.

Playing career

Hull FC
He played in the 2016 Challenge Cup Final victory over the Warrington Wolves at Wembley Stadium.

He played in the 2017 Challenge Cup Final victory over the Wigan Warriors at Wembley Stadium.

Bowden played 18 games for Hull F.C. in the 2020 Super League season including the club's semi-final defeat against Wigan as they almost reached the grand final.

Wakefield Trinity

Josh signed for Wakefield Trinity part way through the 2022 season on a 2 year deal. Josh has stated he wants to help the famous little Yorkshire club to climb the Betfred SuperLeague and become a fierce competitive side.

Wakefield are red hot favourites to be relegated after a turbulent 24 seasons in the top flight. Only Leeds Rhinos, Wigan Warriors, St Helens, Warrington Wolves have never been relegated or merged along with lowly Wakefield

References

External links 
Hull profile
SL profile

1992 births
Living people
Doncaster R.L.F.C. players
English rugby league players
Hull F.C. players
Rugby league players from Yorkshire
Rugby league props
Sportspeople from Beverley
Wakefield Trinity players
York City Knights players